Biglari is a surname. Notable people with the surname include:

 Fereidoun Biglari (born 1970), Iranian archaeologist and museum curator
 Sardar Biglari (born 1977), investor and owner of Biglari Holdings